Skobelevka is a rural locality (a village) in Malinovsky Selsoviet, Belebeyevsky District, Bashkortostan, Russia. The population was 114 as of 2010. There are 5 streets.

Geography 
Skobelevka is located 16 km south of Belebey (the district's administrative centre) by road. Malinovka is the nearest rural locality.

References 

Rural localities in Belebeyevsky District